Trincomalee District ( Tirukōṇamalai Māvaṭṭam;  Trikuṇāmalaya distrikkaya) is one of the 25 districts of Sri Lanka, the second level administrative division of the country. The district is administered by a District Secretariat headed by a District Secretary (previously known as a Government Agent) appointed by the central government of Sri Lanka. The capital of the district is the city of Trincomalee.

Geography
Trincomalee District is located in the east of Sri Lanka in the Eastern Province.

Administrative units
Trincomalee District is divided into 11 Divisional Secretary's Division (DS Divisions), each headed by a Divisional Secretary (previously known as an Assistant Government Agent). The DS Divisions are further sub-divided into 230 Grama Niladhari Divisions (GN Divisions).

Demographics

Population
Trincomalee District's population was 378,182 in 2012.

The population of the district, like the rest of the east and north, has been heavily affected by the civil war. The war killed an estimated 100,000 people. Several hundred thousand Sri Lankan Tamils, possibly as much as one million, emigrated to the West during the war. Many Sri Lankan Tamils also moved to the relative safety of the capital Colombo. The war also caused many people from all ethnic and religious groups who lived in the district to flee to other parts of Sri Lanka, though most of them have returned to the district since the end of the civil war.

Ethnicity

Religion

Politics and government

Local government
Trincomalee District has 13 local authorities of which two are Urban Councils and the remaining 11 are Divisional Councils (Pradesha Sabhai or Pradeshiya Sabha).

Notes

References

External links

 

 
Districts of Sri Lanka